Margot Pilz (born 1936, Haarlem, Netherlands) is an Austrian visual artist and a pioneer of conceptual and digital art in Austria. She was one of the first Austrian artists to combine computers and photography.  Her works reflect the avant-garde culture of the 1960s and 1970s in their experimental techniques and performative aspects. Her work received renewed attention in the 2010s.

Pilz's photographs have been described as "one-second sculptures" or "flash-sculptures".  She often chooses feminist approaches, addressing taboos, stereotyping, and environmental concerns.  In this regard, her work has been compared to that of Valie Export. Much of her work is autobiographical.
She has received a number of awards, including the Theodor Körner Prize (1990).

Biography
Pilz was born in 1936 in Haarlem in the Netherlands. In 1939, when she was three years old, her family fled from the National Socialists to Semarang in Central Java, Indonesia. When the Japanese invaded Indonesia in March 1942,  Pilz's father was sent to a concentration camp in Sumatra. She and her mother spent two years among 8,000 prisoners in Lampersari concentration camp, Semarang, Central Java. In Pilz's case, seven women and two children lived in a tiny filthy room. They suffered from typhus and one of Pilz's legs became infected and as a result is shorter than the other.

In 1954 Pilz went to Vienna to study photography at the Höheren Graphischen Bundeslehr- und Versuchsanstalt, the Federal Training and Research Institute of Graphic Arts. She worked with Hans Weiss as a commercial photographer in Vienna from 1971 to 1978.  In 1976, she received her Meisterprüfung (master's certification) in photography.

Pilz was strongly affected by her arrest by plainclothes police officers at the Third Women's Festival in Vienna on 14 April 1978. She addressed these events through the creation of a body-centered series of self-portraits, communicating emotion to the audience both through expressive gestures and through the state of the linen jacket that she wore at the time of the arrest.  These photographs, in which she is portrayed with crumpled clothes and in crouched postures, have been described as "one-second sculptures" or "flash-sculptures".

In 1978 Pilz also joined the feminist artists network  Internationalen Aktionsgemeinschaft bildender Künstlerinnen (International Action Community of Fine Artists, IntAkt). Her work is closely related to the feminist movement of the 1970s and 1980s. In her work she explored and reflected on the institution of marriage, working conditions of women, and the social role of women. For example, for the work "Arbeiterinnenaltar" (Workers altar, 1981), she photographed workers at the coffee roastery Eduscho and questioned working conditions.
Her photo sequence, The White Cell Project (1983–1985), placed her subjects within a small cardboard room, 165 centimeters wide, that concretized the weight and constraint of societal expectations and norms.

Pilz was a pioneer in media art in Austria. A well-known early work by Pilz was her intervention in a public space Kaorle am Karlsplatz (1982), for which she poured sand on the Karlsplatz in Vienna during the Wiener Festwochen (Vienna Festival) and had sun loungers set up.
In 1991 Pilz created Delphi Digital, together with Roland Alton-Scheidl, for the Ars Electronica in Linz.  The interactive digital installation engaged visitors in questioning environmental policy and democracy. An updated version using smartphones was exhibited in 2015–2016.

From 1990 to 1992 Pilz worked as a lecturer at the Technischen Universität Wien (Vienna University of Technology). In 1991 she was a visiting professor at Pandios Universität Athen, and from 1993 to 1994 she worked at Technischen Universität Graz.

Pilz has donated many of her early works to the city of Vienna, including 2,000 prints and 10,000 negatives from the 1970s to the 1990s. A retrospective of her work, Meilensteine (Milestone) was shown in Vienna in 2015,
and her work is part of internationally shown exhibits on The Feminist Avant-Garde of the 1970s (2016–2018).

In 2018, Margot Pilz was one of five women featured in Sie ist der andere Blick (She is the other gaze), a documentary film created by Christiana Perschon and artist Iris Dostal. The film focuses on feminist artists of the 1970s who were part of the  Viennese art scene. The film examines the ways in which their artistic practice and their feminism interact, as they recall challenges and obstacles that they faced and how they overcame them in both personal and political spaces.
The other women filmed are Renate Bertlmann, 
, 
, and
Karin Mack. The film won a 2018 Theodor Körner Prize.

Exhibitions
 1981: Erweiterte Fotografie, Secession, Vienna
 1984: Orwell und die Gegenwart, Belvedere 21/Museum des 20. Jahrhunderts, Vienna
 1984: 4th Dimension, Dryphoto, Prado, Florence
 1985: Identitätsbilder, Secession, Vienna
 1985: Meditation 85, Graz, Austria
 1985: The White Cell Project, Fotogalerie Wien, Vienna
 1987: Le temps d'un movement, Musée d'Art Moderne de la Ville de Paris, Paris, France
 1988: Computerkunst 88, Museum der Stadt Gladbeck, Wittringen Castle, Gladbeck, Germany
 1988: Hinter den Wänden, Donaufestival, Langenlois, Austria
 1991: Delphi Digital, Ars Electronica, Linz, Austria
 1992: Die Auflösung der Fotografie – Der kalte Raum, Blau-Gelbe Galerie, Vienna
 1992: The Spirit of St. Lucifer, Medien Kunst Archiv (MKA), Vienna
 1993: Tacit Surveillance, Künstlerhaus, Vienna
 1994: Zeit/Schnitte, Patriarchat, Wiener Festwochen, Vienna
 1997: Verstärker/Kaskade, Künstlerhaus, Vienna
 2003: Künstlerinnen – Positionen 1945 bis heute, Krems an der Donau
 2004: Frau im Bild. Inszenierte Weiblichkeit, Passau, Germany
 2005/2006: Die Enzyklopädie der wahren Werte, Künstlerhaus, Vienna
 2007: Die Liebe zu den Objekten, St. Pölten
 2008: Am Puls der Stadt. 2000 Jahre Karlsplatz, Wien Museum, Vienna
 2008: Matrix. Geschlechter – Verhältnisse – Revisionen (MATRIX  –  gender  –  relations  – revisions),  (MUSA), Vienna
 2008: Werkschau XIII. Intakt – die PionierInnen, Fotogalerie Wien, Vienna
 2009: Best of Austria, Lentos Art Museum, Linz
 2010: raum_körper_einsatz, MUSA, Vienna
 2012: Celebration/Me Myself & Them, Künstlerhaus, Vienna
 2012: Margot Pilz, HERSTORY – 36.000 Years of Goddesses and Idols, Austrian Cultural Forum New York
 2014: Aktionistinnen,  & , Krems
 2014: Once upon my time—JAVA 1942, Künstlerhaus, Vienna
 2015: Margot Pilz – Meilensteine. Von der performativen Fotografie zur digitalen Feldforschung, MUSA, Vienna
 2016: The Feminist Avant-Garde of the 1970s, curated by Gabriele Schor and Anna Dannemann, The Photographers' Gallery, London, England
 2017: Aging Pride/Die Kraft des Alters, curator Sabine Fellner, Belvedere, Vienna
 2017: Feministische Avantgarde der 1970er Jahre aus der , ZKM Center for Art and Media Karlsruhe
 2017: The Feminist Avant-Garde of the 1970s, curated by Gabriele Schor and Eva Badura-Triska, MUMOK, Vienna
 2018: WOMAN Feminist Avant-Garde of the 1970s from the SAMMLUNG VERBUND Collection, Vienna, curated by Gabriele Schor, University of Dundee
 2018–2019, Women.Now., curator Sabine Fellner, Austrian Cultural Forum, New York (ACFNY)

Awards
 1983: Staatsstipendium für bildende Kunst
 1985: Römerquelle Fotopreis
 1988: Preis der Österreichischen Postsparkasse
 1990: Theodor Körner Prize
 1996: Pfann-Ohmann-Preis, Künstlerhaus, Vienna
 2008: Goldener Lorbeer, Künstlerhaus, Vienna
 2009: Goldener Lorbeer, Künstlerhaus, Vienna
 2011: Preis der Stadt Wien für Bildende Kunst (Prize of the City of Vienna for Fine Arts)

Books
Pilz's work is discussed in the following:

References

External links
  Margot Pilz on Vimeo

1936 births
Living people
Women conceptual artists
Feminist artists
20th-century women photographers
21st-century women photographers
Artists from Vienna
20th-century Austrian women artists
21st-century Austrian women artists